Jardim Guanabara is a neighborhood located in Ilha do Governador, Rio de Janeiro, Brazil. A point of interest is a beach named Praia da Bica, with a view of the city.

Neighbourhoods in Rio de Janeiro (city)